Ranaudip Singh Bahadur Kunwar Ranaji (alternatively spelled Rana Uddip, Renaudip or Ranoddip), KCSI (3 April 1825 – 22 November 1885), commonly known as Ranodip Singh Kunwar was the second Prime Minister of Nepal from the Rana dynasty. His style was His Excellency Commanding General Shree Shree Shree Maharaja Sir. 

Deeply pious, Ranodip Singh composed several devotional hymns and was granted a personal salute of 15 guns from the British in 1883 and the title of Tung-ling-ping-ma-kuo-kang-wang (Truly Valiant Prince; commander of foot and horse) from the Guangxu Emperor in 1882. He was born as seventh son of Kaji Bal Narsingh Kunwar from his second wife Ganesh Kumari Thapa, daughter of Thapa Kazi General Nain Singh Thapa.

Succession 
As per the family roll of succession, Ranodip Singh succeeded his elder brother Jang Bahadur following his death in 1877.

Assassination

Failed coup attempt of 1882 
Chautariya Colonel Ambar Bikram Shah (son of General H.E. Sri Chautaria Pushkar Shah) and his Gorkhali aide attempted a coup d'état . Chautariya Colonel Ambar Bikram Shah and four others were killed  in Teku by the Ranas for their part in the attempted assassination of Ranodip Singh.

Successful coup d'etat of 1885 
Ranodip Singh was assassinated by his nephews (Khadga Shumsher, Bhim Shumsher , and Dambar Shumsher) during a coup d'état in 1885. He was succeeded by his nephew, Bir Shamsher.

Ancestry

References

1825 births
1885 deaths
Nepalese monarchs
Prime ministers of Nepal
Nepalese military personnel
Military history of Nepal
Fellows of the Royal Geographical Society
Honorary Knights Grand Cross of the Order of the Bath
Honorary Knights Grand Cross of the Order of St Michael and St George
Honorary Knights Grand Commander of the Order of the Star of India
Honorary Knights Grand Cross of the Royal Victorian Order
Assassinated Nepalese politicians
People murdered in Nepal
Assassinated heads of government
Rana regime
Rana dynasty
19th-century prime ministers of Nepal
19th-century Nepalese nobility
Nepalese Hindus
Khas people